This is a list of flags used in Malaysia.

National flags

Monarch

Military

Law Enforcement Flags

Administrative divisions

States

Federal territories

A common flag for the three federal territories was adopted by the Ministry of the Federal Territories on 20 August 2006. The flag is to be used and flown on matters and ceremonies that involve all the federal territories as a whole. An example is in national sporting events; the unified contingent of the territories would be under this common flag. However, the usage of the individual territorial flags would be given preference in events relating to individual territories.

City, district, provincial and municipal 

For flags of districts, towns, and cities in Malaysia, look for the article for each state's flag where said location is in. Below is a gallery of the flags of several Malaysian state capitals.

Order of precedence 
Per government protocol, if a display contains the Jalur Gemilang and all the state flags of Malaysia:

 The Jalur Gemilang shall take precedence before the state flags; 
 The state flags shall be ordered by the date the state's incumbent ruler takes the throne;
 The Federal Territory flag comes last

Political flags

Historical

Sultanate flags

Colonial and national flags

State flags

Proposed Flags

See also 
 Armorial of Malaysia

References

Flag dates published references
 (Ben Cahoon) Malay States on worldstatesmen.org

External links
 Malaysia at Flags of the World
 Information on the Flag of Malaysia at the Malaysian Ministry of Information, Communication and Culture - Department of Information 

Malaysian
Flags